The 1904 United States House of Representatives elections in South Carolina were held on November 8, 1904 to elect seven representatives Representatives for one two-year terms from the state of South Carolina.  All five incumbents who ran were re-elected and the open seats in the 2nd congressional district and 6th congressional district were retained by the Democrats.  The composition of the state delegation thus remained solely Democratic.

1st congressional district
Incumbent Congressman George Swinton Legaré of the 1st congressional district, in office since 1903, defeated two Republican challengers.

General election results

|-
| 
| colspan=5 |Democratic hold
|-

2nd congressional district
Incumbent Democratic Congressman Theodore G. Croft of the 2nd congressional district, in office since 1904, did not seek re-election.  James O'H. Patterson won the Democratic primary and defeated Republican Isaac Myers in the general election.

Democratic primary

General election results

|-
| 
| colspan=5 |Democratic hold
|-

3rd congressional district
Incumbent Democratic Congressman Wyatt Aiken of the 3rd congressional district, in office since 1903, defeated I.H. McCalla in the Democratic primary and Republican John Scott in the general election.

Democratic primary

General election results

|-
| 
| colspan=5 |Democratic hold
|-

4th congressional district
Incumbent Democratic Congressman Joseph T. Johnson of the 4th congressional district, in office since 1901, defeated Republican challenger J.D. Adams.

General election results

|-
| 
| colspan=5 |Democratic hold
|-

5th congressional district
Incumbent Democratic Congressman David E. Finley of the 5th congressional district, in office since 1899, defeated T. Yancey Williams in the Democratic primary and Republican C.P. White in the general election.

Democratic primary

General election results

|-
| 
| colspan=5 |Democratic hold
|-

6th congressional district
Incumbent Democratic Congressman Robert B. Scarborough of the 6th congressional district, in office since 1901, opted to retire.  J. Edwin Ellerbe, brother of former South Carolina Governor William Haselden Ellerbe, won the Democratic primary and defeated Republican E.H. Deas in the general election.

Democratic primary

General election results

|-
| 
| colspan=5 |Democratic hold
|-

7th congressional district
Incumbent Democratic Congressman Asbury Francis Lever of the 7th congressional district, in office since 1901, defeated Republican challenger C.C. Jacobs.

General election results

|-
| 
| colspan=5 |Democratic hold
|-

See also
United States House of Representatives elections, 1904
South Carolina gubernatorial election, 1904
South Carolina's congressional districts

References

"Report of the Secretary of State to the General Assembly of South Carolina.  Part II." Reports and Resolutions of the General Assembly of the State of South Carolina. Volume II. Columbia, SC: 1905, p. 375.

United States House of Representatives
1904
South Carolina